The Archangel Michael are silver and gold bullion coins originating from Ukraine and minted by the  National Bank of Ukraine.

Design 

Obverse:  The coat of arms of Ukraine and the inscription "" (National Bank of Ukraine) are at the top of the coin. Inside an octagonal cartouche at the centre is a shield with the emblem of the National Bank of Ukraine. At the bottom of the coin, it is inscribed in Ukrainian the value of the coin.  On the one-ounce silver coin, it is inscribed with "" (one hryvnia).

Reverse: Depicted is the Taxiarch Archangel Michael. He is depicted here as a warrior, wearing full armor and holding a sword in his right hand.  There is the circular inscription "".  Which translates into "...For us and souls of righteous men, and Archistrategos Michael's strength", from Taras Shevchenko's Ukrainian poem Haydamaky.

Specifications

Mintage

See also
 Bullion
 Bullion coin
 Gold as an investment
 Inflation hedge
 Silver as an investment

References
 General
 2020 Standard Catalog of World Coins - 2001–Date, 14th Edition, publication date 2019, Krause Publications, 

Specific

Bullion coins of Ukraine
Gold bullion coins
Silver bullion coins